Choppies Enterprises Limited is a Botswana multinational grocery and general merchandise retailer headquartered in Gaborone, Botswana. The retailer initially sold only food-based (both fresh groceries and wholesale long-life foods) and other fast-moving consumer goods. The group owns a centralized, in-house distribution network in South Africa, Zimbabwe, Zambia and Kenya.

Choppies became a listed company on the Botswana Stock Exchange on January 26, 2012, and is a constituent of the BSE Domestic Company Index with an approximate market capitalization of P2.4 billion as of December 20, 2012.

The company also completed its secondary listing on the Johannesburg stock exchange on May 27, 2015.

History

Choppies was founded in 1986 with one supermarket named Wayside Supermarket (Proprietary) Limited in Lobatse by the Chopdat family, with a second store opening in 1993.

In 1999 the company had only two stores.  Since 1999 the company grew to become the dominant leader in the fast-moving consumer good industry in Botswana.  The management team includes the founding members of Choppies, Mr. Farouk Ismail who is the current Deputy Chairman and Mr. Ramachandaran Ottapathu who is the current CEO.  They are also the major shareholders with each holding 34.2% of the company's shares.  In 2003 the group consolidated into one structure.  It previously franchised under different names.

Due to its exponential growth since 1999, there was demand for the company to become listed on the nation's stock market.  The management team eventually agreed, and the company became listed on January 26, 2012. The company hired Grant Thornton to manage the administration front of the firm's initial public offering, with 1.2 billion shares being listed at an offer price of BWP 1.15 per share, with 25% going into the hands of the public. The IPO was the largest on the Botswana Stock Exchange raising P350 million in both the IPO and the private placement, with the shares being oversubscribed by up to 400%.

Operations

The South African operations are executed through a wholly owned subsidiary Choppies Supermarkets SA (Proprietary) Limited, which operates in the Limpopo, North-West and Free State provinces.

Distribution and supply
Choppies' distribution centres function as a central sourcing for Choppies stores. The company's top 200 products are delivered in bulk to the distribution centres and then distributed from there to the stores. Other products are delivered from the source to the stores directly. Choppies operates two distribution centres in Botswana; one in the International Commerce Park in Gaborone, and the other in Lobatse. A new 10,000m2 South African distribution centre opened in September 2012 in Rustenburg to serve the South African stores.

Welldone (Proprietary) Limited, a wholly owned subsidiary of the Choppies Group, is a logistics company that supports the day-to-day operations of the stores. The company has a branded fleet of 245 commercial vehicles which distributes products to all Group stores. 

In 2008, the first store in Zeerust, South Africa was opened there by expanding in the north west region. 2014 was the year when the group opened its first distribution centre in Zimbabwe and in the year 2016 the secondary listing was done in the Johannesburg stock exchange. By the end of 2015 Zambian operations began and in early 2016 saw the acquisition of Jwayelani group in Durban, South Africa. Kenyan acquisition of Ulkwala group was also carried out in early 2016. As part of long term growth plan the group opened its first store in Tanzania and Mozambique in 2017.

Store types and product ranges

The Choppies Group operates hyper stores, super stores and value stores depending on their respective sizes, selling over 45,000 different products. Choppies sells both branded and own-brand products, primarily packaged and long-life foods. All of our stores are located in urban, semi urban and rural areas in sub-Saharan Africa, with proximity to residential areas and transport nodes.

The group owns 286 quality own brands ranging from food and beverages to cosmetics, clothing, and cleaning products.

Competitors

The company's main competitors include retailers SPAR, Pick N Pay, Woolworths Foods, Shoprite and small local general dealers. The Group has a current market share in Botswana of 30%, according to an independent survey conducted by Briggs and Associates. Despite numerous competitors, Choppies has managed to expand to some African countries starting with South Africa. Here, it is in tough competition with its rivals but is still the preferred retailer giving it an upper hand in exploring foreign markets.

Corporate social responsibility

Botswana 
•	In partnership with Virgin Active Gaborone, Choppies organized a Wellness Day for staff members to promote health and wellness in the workplace. 
•	Together with the Lady Khama Charitable Trust Fund, Choppies donated BWP 1.2 million in groceries to border patrol soldiers and nurses working over the Christmas holidays.

•	Donation of food hampers to Gamodubu Children Home in Gaborone, which cares for over 100 children under the age of 17.

•	Participation in a lunch for Gabane House of Hope, an old age home located in Gabane. Choppies also donated blankets and towels. 

•	Organized a lunch for orphans at Childline Botswana on Mother's Day.

South Africa 
•	Donation of hampers to Women Against Rape.

•	Donation of grocery hampers to a children's community centre .

•	Donation of snack hampers to a children's centre in Boeshoek, North West.

Zambia 
•	Support to Njovu Community Centre in Chibolya province, which provides education activities and sponsorship for over 200 troubled youth.

Zimbabwe 
•	Donation of groceries to Ingutsheni Central Hospital in Bulawayo.

Criticism

Choppies has attracted criticism from the public in the past due to salary discrepancy. Employees such as cashiers and packers claim to earn less than P900 a month, whilst executives such as the CEO and Deputy Chairman earn more than P30 000 000.00 per annum. This has attracted outrage as the company is historically very profitable yet is not rewarding the lower-skilled workers on terms they consider fair to their efforts; in 2011, the Group made over P124 million in after-tax profits, with a dividend over P121 million paid out to shareholders.

See also 

 Sefalana
 Square Eats
 Shoprite (retailer)
 Checkers (supermarket chain)
List of supermarket chains in Botswana
List of supermarket chains in Africa

References

External links 
 Official Website
 Bloomberg Market Data

Food and drink companies of Botswana
Retail companies established in 1986
1986 establishments in Botswana
Companies listed on the Botswana Stock Exchange
Companies of Gaborone
Botswana companies